St. Vincent Island may mean:

 São Vicente, Cape Verde, one of the Barlavento islands
 Saint Vincent (Antilles), the largest part of Saint Vincent and the Grenadines, in the Caribbean
 St. Vincent Island (Florida), a barrier island in the United States